Crotty (and variations O’Crotty, Crotti, Crottee, etc.) are anglicisations of the Irish name Ó Crotaigh – ‘Descendant of Crotach’. The name dates from medieval times, to the pre-Norman kingdom of Thomond ('North Munster') where the Dál gCais (in English: ‘Dalcassian’) clan, centred on the regional rulers – the Uí Briain (O'Brien) family – were dominant.  The Crottys were one of eight septs of the O’Briens (i.e. descended via the female line – hence the different surnames).  They settled in Western Co.Waterford and Eastern Co.Cork.

In common with the O’Briens – and the millions of descendants of the other seven septs – the Crotty sept's likely ultimate common ancestor is Brian Bóruma mac Cennétig (‘Brian Boru’) c.941 – 1014, and therefore possibly (via the Dál gCais) as far back as Cormac Cas in the 3rd century.

The name originates in present-day County Clare, and (despite extensive emigration) is still most common in the general area of the former kingdom of Thomond (i.e. West Waterford, Clare, South Tipperary, parts of Cork and Limerick).

Spelling variations include Crotty, O'Crotty, Crotti, Crothon, Crotton, Crotone, Crottee, Crottey, O'Crottey, O'Crottee, O'Crottie, Croddy, and Cratty.  Other non-anglicised versions in use include Crothaigh, Chrothaigh etc.

The other seven related septs of the O'Briens are the families: Bernard, Consadine, Lysaght, MacMahon, O'Mahoney, Padden/MacFadden and Plunkett.

Places
Crotty, Tasmania, Australia
Crotty Dam, Tasmania, Australia
 Seneca, Illinois, United States, known as Crotty prior to 1957

Notable people with the Crotty surname
Elizabeth 'Lizzie' Crotty (1885–1960), Irish traditional musician from Kilrush, Co.Clare. An annual music festival was held in the town for many years in her memory.
Horace Crotty, (1886–1952), Australian clergyman
James Crotty, disambiguation page for
James Crotty (economist)
James Crotty (Prospector), (1845–1898), Tasmanian prospector
Jim Crotty, American football cornerback
Joe Crotty, (1860–1926), American baseball player
John Crotty, American basketball player
Kieran Crotty, Irish politician
Maggie Crotty (1948–2020), American politician; Illinois Senator
Michael Francis Crotty (born 1970), Apostolic Nuncio
Mick Crotty, Irish hurling player
Patrick Crotty (1902–1970), Irish politician
Paul A. Crotty, (born 1941), United States federal judge
Raymond Crotty (1925–1994), historian and litigant in the Irish constitutional case Crotty v. An Taoiseach.
Rich Crotty (born 1948), Florida politician
Ron Crotty (born 1929), Bass player for the original Dave Brubeck Trio
Ryan Crotty (born 1988), New Zealand rugby player
Shane Crotty (born 1974), American immunologist and virologist
Thomas Crotty (1912–1942), American Coast Guardsman held as POW during World War II
William Crotty  ("Crotty the Robber") was a highwayman who was hanged in Waterford in 1742.  Several of his hideouts in the Comeragh Mountains are named after him.

See also
Crotty Schism, early 19th-century minor Irish church schism
Van Dyne Crotty Inc, textile leasing company in the United States

External links
 Map of Ireland showing Crotty family distribution in the 19th Century

Septs of the Dál gCais